Iqt اقط baql بقل mrees مريس mtheer مضير kithy كثي Jameed (Arabic: جميد, literally "hardened") is a Beduin (mainly the Levant, Iraq, Arabia, Balochistan and Afghanistan) consisting of hard dry laban made from ewe or goat's milk. Milk is kept in a fine woven cheesecloth to make a thick yogurt. Salt is added daily to thicken the yogurt even more and the outside of the yogurt-filled cheesecloth is rinsed with water to allow any remaining whey to seep through. After a few days of salting the yogurt, it becomes very dense and can be removed from the cheesecloth and shaped into round balls. It is then set to dry for a few days. If it is dried in the sun it becomes yellow; if it is dried in the shade it remains white. It is important that the jameed is dry to the core because any dampness can spoil the preservation process. Jameed is the primary ingredient used to make mansaf, the national dish of Jordan.

Origin
It is a well-known way of preserving dairy amongst bedouins in Saudi Arabia, Jordan, southern Syria, southern Iraq.
Traditionally, Bedouins supplied Jordanian markets with jameed and other sheep and goat dairy products. Jameed is used in Jordanian dishes such as fatta, mahashi and mansaf, the latter also being the national dish of Jordan. Karak, Jordan is famous for its high-quality jameed. It is used in other Jordanian dishes such as Kousa Mahshi, Kubbeh blabaniyyeh, Mjalaleh, Rashouf, Madgoga and er-Rgage.

Production
Traditionally, jameed was made in late spring and early summer when sheep's milk is most plentiful. The first step was shaking the yogurt in a leather bag made from sheep or goat leather to separate the butter. The leftover buttermilk was then reduced by boiling until it reached a consistency similar to labaneh (thick yogurt). It could then be salted, shaped into balls, and sun-dried. The dried balls could be preserved for months in sealed boxes without refrigeration as they were very low in moisture. Nowadays, people consume jameed for its flavour rather than lack of refrigeration.

See also

 List of lamb dishes
 List of yogurt-based dishes and beverages

References

External links 

Arab cuisine
Jordanian cuisine
Palestinian cuisine
Middle Eastern cuisine
Yogurt-based dishes